Linky Boshoff and Ilana Kloss were the defending champions, but lost in the second round to Mima Jaušovec and Virginia Ruzici.

Martina Navratilova and Betty Stöve won the title by defeating Renée Richards and Betty Ann Stuart 6–1, 7–6 in the final.

Seeds

Draw

Finals

Top half

Section 1

Section 2

Bottom half

Section 3

Section 4

References
 Official results archive (WTA)
1977 US Open – Women's draws and results at the International Tennis Federation

Women's Doubles
US Open (tennis) by year – Women's doubles
1977 in women's tennis
1977 in American women's sports